is a Japanese mobile game developed by GREE, Inc. A manga adaptation began serialization in Jump Square in 2012. An anime series by Toei Animation and TV Tokyo began airing on 7 July 2012.

Gameplay
Tanken Driland is a card-battling quest-based RPG. The player assumes the role of a hunter, and acquires hero cards which are used to defeat dire monsters and collect treasures. The cards gain experience points and can be upgraded. It is also a cooperative game; players can team up to defeat stronger opponents.

Characters

First series 

The main character in the story is the Princess of Elua who wishes to become a hunter innit. She is kind and doesn't leave any of her friends behind. In episode 10, it is shown that she has mysterious powers. Her weapon is a sword.

Mikoto's personal assistant, he cares greatly and protects Mikoto from any dangers. He has motion sickness.

Poron wants to become a hero and show his brothers and his parents how strong he is. He received a small hat from a fairy in episode 2. His weapon is a gun which at the beginning he did not know how to use. He loves to eat and always carries some food. He also loves looking for treasures.

A hunter who first appeared in episode 4. He first travels alone but then starts traveling with the gang. His weapon is something like a spear.

A hunter who teaches Mikoto everything there needs to be a hunter. She also trains her. Boni has a hawk named Alder.

He worries about Mikoto a lot and doesn't what her to become a hunter because it is too dangerous. He somewhat knows about Mikoto's powers. At episode 7 he finally says that Mikoto can become a hunter.

Sennen no Mahō

Main Party 

The main character in the story of Sennen no Mahō. Wielding a drill-shaped sword capable of drilling as well as enlarging. Accidentally swallowing the Goddess Drop, he acquired magical energy, allowing him to return the others powers temporarily.

Flame Mononofu Hunter.

Thunder Magical Hunter.
/

Water Spear Hunter. He's a snail lover. In episode 71, he left the team. Then Claudia encouraged him to go back to the team. After that, he saved Hagan and Kibamaru by his new skill from Nasha.

Minor antagonists of the 1st arc of Sennen no Mahō and Narrators of the mini-corner Mekki & Shakki's Drillous World. Mekki and Shakki join the main party of 2nd arc.

Hunters 

Narrator of the story of Mikoto and Hunter of Sennen no Mahō.

The Goddess that rules over fire. She was found and freed by Hagan and the others. She was captured by Gort after helping Hagan free Clara.

 
Her Card was originally found by Haruka but was stolen by Zelgado. Gort engulfed in darkness twisting her personality, making her into his servant. Was freed by Hagan in episode 20 so that she hugged him when she saw him.
 
 She's the goddess who ruled over thunder.

 He led Kibamaru and other teammates to attack Goda

Terreur 

 
He was originally a firefighter in Retron but after his younger sister died, and the people of Retron living slovenly after her sacrifice, he left and became a Hunter. He met Gort, who told him that he will bring his sister back to life if he helps Gort become God. He wields a sword and uses the element of water.

Dri Tenkai 

 

 
One main rival of 2nd arc.

Dri Makai 

One main rival of 2nd arc.

Other

Antagonists 

 
The main antagonist of 1st arc. A user darkness, but after his rebirth, he acquired the power of light. Before falling into darkness, he was puppet using hunter who possessed no element. When his village fell to a plague, he gathered herbs but he was too late to save anyone. He traveled around villages trying to help them but could only witness the tragedy that occurred. He fell into despair over the twisted world.

 
/
 
The main antagonist of 2nd arc.

Opening
 First series: "Together ~Tanken Driland~! (Together ～探検ドリランド～!)" by Sakura
 Sennen no Mahō - 1st arc: "Go ahead!" by Hideyuki Takahashi
 Sennen no Mahō - 2nd arc: "Go ahead! 〜SSR〜" by Hideyuki Takahashi and Sakura with Mekki & Shakki

Ending

First series 
"DRAGON BOY" by Civilian Skunk
"Nagareboshi" by 96Neko
"BUNBUN NINE9'"  by Cheeky Parade

Sennen no Mahō 
"STEP & GO" by PASSPO☆
"BLESSING CARD" by VALSHE
"JUVENILE!!!!" by Hanae
"you can do it!" by Suzu

References

External links
 

2012 anime television series debuts
2013 anime television series debuts
2012 manga
Android (operating system) games
Anime television series based on video games
Digital collectible card games
Fantasy anime and manga
IOS games
Japan-exclusive video games
Japanese children's animated adventure television series
Japanese children's animated fantasy television series
Manga based on video games
Role-playing video games
Shōnen manga
Shueisha franchises
Shueisha manga
Toei Animation television
TV Tokyo original programming
Video games developed in Japan